John Gorell Barnes, 1st Baron Gorell PC (16 May 1848 – 22 April 1913), was a British lawyer and judge.

Biography
Gorell was the eldest son of Henry Barnes, a shipowner of Liverpool, and was educated at Peterhouse, Cambridge. where he took his degree in 1868. He began work as a solicitor, but was called to the Bar in 1876 and became a Queen's Counsel in 1888.

He was well known as an expert in Admiralty cases, and in 1892 was made a Judge of the Probate, Divorce and Admiralty Division of the High Court of Justice, where he acted as president during the illness of Sir Francis Jeune in late 1902. When Jeune retired in 1905, Gorell was appointed president of the division from 1905 until 1909. He was admitted to the Privy Council in 1905 and in 1909 he was raised to the peerage as Baron Gorell, of Brampton in the County of Derby. He died in April 1913, aged 64, and was succeeded in the barony by his eldest son Henry Gorell Barnes.

Family

Lord Gorell married Mary, daughter of Thomas Mitchell, in 1881.

Arms

Notes

References 
De Montmorency, James Edward Geoffrey,  John Gorell Barnes, First Lord Gorell (1848-1913), A Memoir  , London: John Murray, 1920.
Kidd, Charles; Williamson, David (editors). Debrett's Peerage and Baronetage (1990 edition). New York: St Martin's Press, 1990, 

Attribution

Gorell, John Gorell Barnes, 1st Baron
Gorell, John Gorell Barnes, 1st Baron
Gorell, John Gorell Barnes, 1st Baron
Gorell, John Gorell Barnes, 1st Baron
Gorell, John Gorell Barnes, 1st Baron
English King's Counsel
19th-century King's Counsel
Gorell, John Gorel Barnes, 1st Baron
Probate, Divorce and Admiralty Division judges
Knights Bachelor
Members of the Judicial Committee of the Privy Council
20th-century English judges
Peers created by Edward VII
Presidents of the Probate, Divorce and Admiralty Division